The Rammert is a forested hill range, up to , in the Keuper Uplands of central Baden-Württemberg, which belongs to the natural region major unit of Schönbuch and Glemswald in the Swabian Keuper-Lias Land. It continues the Schönbuch to the south(west) and is separated from it by the Tübingen Bay (Tübinger Stufenrandbucht)  at the Neckar near Tübingen. The majority of the ridge lies in the county of Tübingen, with small elements in the county of Zollernalbkreis.

Geography 
The Rammert extends for 18 kilometres from Rangendingen in the southwest to Tübingen in the northeast and is 7 kilometres across at its widest point between Rottenburg am Neckar and Ofterdingen. In the north it is bounded by the Neckar valley, in the southeast by the Steinlach valley and in the southwest by the water gap of the Starzel. In the northeast it peters out to a point, which gives it a roughly triangular shape.

The valleys of the Vorbach, Katzenbach and Krebsbach streams, which head northwards or northeastwards, divide the Rammert sharply. As part of the South German Scarplands the Rammert tilts slightly towards the southeast and forms a striking ledge, about 100 to 150 metres high on the rim of the Neckar valley.

The Weilerburg (555 m) which lies in front of the Rammert to the north is an outlier of it. The southeastern slopes on the opposite side are gentler. There the Rammert transitions gradually into the rocks of the Black and Brown Jurassic rocks of the Jura Foreland.

The Rammert predominantly forested because of its sandy and clayey soils that are unfavourable for farming. Its forests are intensively used for forestry. The main tree species are beech, spruce, Scots pine and oak. Extensive wetlands only cover parts of the valleys.

References 

Special Areas of Conservation in Germany
Mountain and hill ranges of Baden-Württemberg
Forests and woodlands of Baden-Württemberg
Natural regions of the Swabian Keuper-Lias Plains
Tübingen (district)
Zollernalbkreis